Liu Zhenya (born 1952) is Chairman of Global Energy Interconnection Development and Cooperation Organization (GEIDCO) which proposes to build a global super grid of low-loss HVDC power lines for long distance energy exchange and trade.

Biography
Liu Zhenya is a native of Shandong province. He graduated from the Shandong Industrial Institute in engineering, and joined the CPC in 1984. He has spent his career in the state power administration. Liu served as director of the Shandong Provincial Electric Power Bureau until 1997. He is currently Chairman of Global Energy Interconnection Development and Cooperation Organization (GEIDCO) and an alternate member of the 17th CPC Central Committee.

Liu Zhenya has been President of State Grid from 2004 to 2013. The Times reported that he had "been forced into fire-fighting outrage at home after the worst snowstorms in half a century crippled power lines, blacked out cities and brought the electrified railways to a standstill."

In 2018 he was elected an International Fellow of the Royal Academy of Engineering in the UK.

References

1952 births
Living people
Shandong University alumni
Fellows of the Royal Academy of Engineering
State Grid Corporation of China people
Chinese electrical engineers
Engineers from Shandong
Alternate members of the 17th Central Committee of the Chinese Communist Party